Devon Fisher (born October 22, 1993) is an American soccer player who most recently played for Jacksonville Armada in the NASL.

Career

College and amateur
Fisher played four years of college soccer at Virginia Commonwealth University between 2011 and 2014, including a red-shirted year in 2011.

During and after college, Fisher played with Premier Development League side Portland Timbers U23s.

Professional
Fisher joined United Soccer League club Portland Timbers 2 in 2015, following a spell with Portland's PDL side.

The NASL club Jacksonville Armada FC announced his signing on March 9, 2017 He left the club ahead of the 2018 season.

Personal 
Fisher is the brother of Pittsburgh Riverhounds soccer player Ritchie Duffie.

References

External links
Timbers 2 bio

1993 births
Living people
American soccer players
VCU Rams men's soccer players
Portland Timbers U23s players
Portland Timbers 2 players
Tacoma Defiance players
Jacksonville Armada FC players
Association football defenders
Soccer players from Norfolk, Virginia
USL League Two players
USL Championship players
Sportspeople from Chesapeake, Virginia